The Alfa Romeo 430A was a bus produced from 1949 to 1953 by Italian automotive manufacturer Alfa Romeo.

Technical characteristics
The bus had two doors and a rack. It had a  engine. The bus had seating for 22 passenger and standing room for a further 30 people. It was based on a body from Ambrosini.

History
The Alfa Romeo 430A bus was used for tourist trips and for intercity service in the Lombardy region of Italy.

See also
 Alfa Romeo 430
 List of buses

430A